Gautam Mitra is a research scientist in the field of Operational Research in general and computational optimization and modelling in particular. In 2004 he was awarded the title of ‘distinguished professor’ by Brunel University in recognition of his contributions in the domain of computational optimization, risk analytics and modelling. He headed the Mathematics Department (1990-2001) and subsequently founded the Center for the Analysis of Risk and Optimization Modelling Application (CARISMA). He is an emeritus Professor of Brunel University and a visiting professor of University College London. He has published five books and over hundred and fifty research articles.

Professor Mitra is the founder and the CEO of OptiRisk Systems where he directs research and actively pursues the development of the company in the domain of optimization and financial analytics. In OptiRisk he has developed and leads a research group in his areas of specialization with talented researchers from UK, India, Europe, USA,  and Brazil. Professor Mitra is also the founder and chairman of the sister company UNICOM seminars. OptiRisk systems and UNICOM Seminars also have subsidiaries in India. In India and Southeast Asia both the companies are going through a period of organic growth.

Early life and education

School and early life
Until the age of 14 Gautam was taught by his mother Meera Rani Mitra who had a thorough grounding in Mathematics and academic topics prior to her marriage at an early age. This foundational  training had kindled Gautam's interest in all aspects of Mathematics and its applications.

Graduation
After joining Presidency University, Kolkata in 1956 for intermediate science he made the choice of academic work and dropped  competitive sports and hobby. This was the time in India when Engineering was seen to be the future pillar of the country. He had to make another choice between Science and Engineering, so he joined and graduated as an Electrical Engineer from Jadavpur University. 
The next choice for Post Graduate Studies was between Massachusetts Institute of Technology and Queen Mary University of London. As the tradition in the family was to travel to the UK rather than USA, in 1962 he joined Queen Mary University of London for an MPhil in Electrical Engineering. But attending a workshop in Mercury Auto (assembly) Code for numerical computation he was completely smitten by the new technology. To the disappointment of his QMC supervisor with whom he had written two papers and designed a measuring instrument he joined the newly formed Institute of Computer Science as a temporary programmer and then a research fellow gaining a PhD in 1968.

Career 
After gaining his PhD Gautam worked under Martin Beale, renowned optimisation specialist and director of Scientific Control Systems, and became a key member of the team developing optimisation solvers. After four more years in industry he joined Brunel University London as a lecturer. Subsequently, he rose to be the Head of Department of Mathematics. He founded CARISMA, a research centre in risk analysis and optimisation. Under his leadership the Mathematics department flourished, being rated second best research department in the London area; he retired in 2009.

Personal and Professional Interests

Sports 
During school days he was a junior Table Tennis (state) Champion and a star ‘Aero Modeller’. In later life he is passionate about tennis: he plays and watches Tennis with equal interest.

Science and Engineering 
Gautam believes in research and is excited by creating and exploiting knowledge. He sees the former as part of Science and the latter as part of Engineering; his role models are Thomas Edison, Jagadish Chandra Bose, Claude Shannon and Edward O. Thorp. He is very much inspired by their lives and achievements.

Entrepreneurial Activities 
After his PhD Gautam had to make a choice between academia and industry. He started in industry but in 1974 switched to academia and Joined Brunel University London and retired in 2009. The retirement gave him the chance to fulfil his ambition as an entrepreneur. The two companies UNICOM, a knowledge dissemination company and OptiRisk, an analytics company are academic spinoffs. Having left the academia, Gautam and his wife Dhira have devoted their energies to develop and grow these two companies.

Beliefs 
Gautam believes in honesty, transparency, respect as essential part of one's value system. Gautam values questioning and criticism when this is constructive. On his part he does not hold back criticism of his friends, colleagues and peers when he considers this to be appropriate.

Awards and honours 
 Rector's Gold Medal of Best Graduating student Jadavpur University (1962)
 Distinguished Professor Brunel University (2004)
 Fellow of British Computer Society
 Fellow of Institute of Mathematics and its Applications
 Fellow of Royal Society of Arts
 Patron of the Royal Institution

Books
Authored:
Theory and Application of Mathematical Programming, Academic Press, December 1976.
(with N Koutsoukis) Decision Modelling and Information Systems: The Information Value Chain, INFORMS Operations Research/ Computer Science Interfaces Series, publishers Kluwer Press, G Mitra, N Koutsoukis, (2003).

Edited:

Computer Assisted Decision Making: expert systems, decision analysis, mathematical programming. Published by North Holland in August 1986 in their AI catalogue.
Mathematical Models for Decision Support, Editor G. Mitra, in NATO Advanced Study Institute Series, 1988, by Springer Verlag.
Annals of Operations Research, Vol.43, Applied Mathematical Programming and Modelling: APMOD91, Edited by G. Mitra and I. Maros, Baltzer AG Science Publishers, Switzerland, 1993.
 Annals of Operations Research, Vol.58, Applied Mathematical Programming and Modelling: APMOD93, Edited by G. Mitra and I. Maros, Baltzer AG Science Publishers, Switzerland, 1995.
 Annals of Operations Research, Vol.75, Applied Mathematical Programming and Modelling: APMOD95, Edited by G. Mitra, I. Maros and A. Sciomachen, Baltzer AG Science Publishers, Switzerland, 1997.
Annals of Operations Research, Applied Mathematical Programming and Modelling: APMOD98, Edited by G. Mitra, I. Maros and H. Vladimirou, Baltzer AG Science Publishers, Switzerland, 2000 (now Kluwer Press)
 Annals of Operations Research, Applied Mathematical Programming and Modelling: APMOD2000, Edited by G. Mitra and I. Maros, Baltzer AG Science Publishers, Switzerland, 2002, (Now Kluwer Press)

References 

20th-century British mathematicians
British science writers
Living people
Academics of Brunel University London
1941 births